Kumho Petrochemical Co., Ltd. (abbr. KKPC) is a multinational chemical company based in South Korea, with headquarters in Seoul. It was founded in 1970 when Kumho Group struggled to secure raw materials for its bus and tire businesses. Kumho Petrochemical has a global market leadership in the manufacturing of synthetic rubbers with the world's largest production capacity based on SBR and BR by IISRP 2012. It focuses on synthetic rubbers, synthetic resins, specialty chemicals, electronic chemicals, energy, building materials and advanced materials as its core business.

In 2011, Kumho Petrochemical was ranked at 1806th of 'the Global 2000' by Forbes. In 2013, it became a component of the KOSPI 100 index, which tracks 100 major companies listed on the Korea Stock Exchange.

It changed its name from 'Korea Kumho Petrochemical' to 'Kumho Petrochemical' effective 15 February 2012.

It was spun off from Kumho Asiana Group in December 2015.

Products

 Synthetic Rubbers
Kumho Petrochemical's main business is synthetic rubbers. It has built up market leadership at general synthetic rubbers such as BR(Butadiene Rubber) and SBR(Styrene-butadiene Rubber) over 40 years. World's top-tier tire makers are its long-term customers. Recently, it also has developed and delivered eco-friendly and high energy-efficient synthetic rubbers such as S-SBR(Solution Styrene Butadiene Rubber) and Nd-BR(Neodymium Polybutadiene Rubber) which EU tire label requires.

 Specialty Chemicals
Kumho Petrochemical has the world's second largest production capacity of 6PPD, antioxidant products for industrial rubbers. It has created synergy effects through vertical integration of synthetic rubbers and specialty chemicals businesses.

 Synthetic resins
Synthetic resins are another biggest businesses of Kumho Petrochemical based on sales revenue. It delivers general and high-performance plastic materials such as PS (polystyrene), ABS (acrylonitrile butadiene styrene), EPS (expandable polystyrene), SAN (styrene acrylonitrile), PPG (polypropylene glycol), etc.

 Others
Electronic chemicals, combined heat and power plants, carbon-nano-tube materials are other growing business of Kumho Petrochemical. It produces raw electronic materials for use in semiconductors and display components, and operates combined heat and power plants to provide energy to its own affiliates. It is venturing into the future high-tech carbon-nano-tube materials business.

Management Issues
At the end of 2012, Kumho Petrochemical ended its restructuring program under creditors supervision successfully with its highest credit rating of 'A−' (Stable) by Korea Investors Service. It was the first success case since Kumho Asiana Group entered into a 'workout' program to pay down the debt at the end of 2009.

It resulted from its independent management from its parent 'Kumho Asiana Group,' based on the creditors' agreement which Park Chan-koo, fourth son of founder and chairman of Kumho Petrochemical, took responsibility for Kumho Petrochemical and its subsidiaries, and Park Sam-koo, third son and Kumho group chairman, for Kumho Tire since February 2010. Kumho Petrochemical is struggling to separate the company and its affiliates from Kumho Asiana Group.

Affiliates
 Kumho P&B Chemicals provides BPA (bisphenol A), MIBK (methyl isobutyl ketone), epoxy resin, phenol, and acetone. In terms of production capacity, it is 5th BPA maker and 9th phenol maker in the world. (founded in 1976)
 Kumho Polychem provides EPDM(ethylene propylene diene monomer) with 4th largest production capacity in the world. (founded in 1985)
 Kumho Mitsui Chemicals provides MDI(methylene diphenyl diisocyanate). (founded in 1989)
 Kumho Trading (founded in 2000)
 Kumho T&L (founded in 2009)

References

External links 
 

Companies listed on the Korea Exchange
Chemical companies of Korea
Manufacturing companies based in Seoul